The Ranks and insignia of Home Guard follows the NATO system of ranks and insignia, as does the rest of the Danish Defence.

Historic
With the creation of the Home Guard in 1949, it adopted its own rank system, which was also used by the Women's Army Corps.

Current
On 1 June 1962, the Home Guard adopted the ranks of the rest of the Danish Defence. However, only up to OF-7.

Officers

Enlisted

Specialist
Along with the  rank, Specialist ranks were also introduced. These ranks were created to remove the need for leadership training at the lower ranks, as the selected functions no longer require actual leadership.

References

Bibliography 
 
 

Military ranks of Denmark